In mathematics, the concept of a projective space originated from the visual effect of perspective, where parallel lines seem to meet at infinity. A projective space may thus be viewed as the extension of a Euclidean space, or, more generally, an affine space with points at infinity, in such a way that there is one point at infinity of each direction of parallel lines.

This definition of a projective space has the disadvantage of not being isotropic, having two different sorts of points, which must be considered separately in proofs. Therefore, other definitions are generally preferred. There are two classes of definitions. In synthetic geometry, point and line are primitive entities that are related by the incidence relation "a point is on a line" or "a line passes through a point", which is subject to the axioms of projective geometry. For some such set of axioms, the projective spaces that are defined have been shown to be equivalent to those resulting from the following definition, which is more often encountered in modern textbooks.

Using linear algebra, a projective space of dimension  is defined as the set of the vector lines (that is, vector subspaces of dimension one) in a vector space  of dimension . A projective space of dimension 1 is a projective line, and a projective space of dimension 2 is a projective plane.

Projective spaces are widely used in geometry, as allowing simpler statements and simpler proofs. For example, in affine geometry, two distinct lines in a plane intersect in at most one point, while, in projective geometry, they intersect in exactly one point. Also, there is only one class of conic sections, which can be distinguished only by their intersections with the line at infinity: two intersection points for hyperbolas; one for the parabola, which is tangent to the line at infinity; and no real intersection point of ellipses.

In topology, and more specifically in manifold theory, projective spaces play a fundamental role, being typical examples of non-orientable manifolds.

Motivation

As outlined above, projective spaces were introduced for formalizing statements like "two coplanar lines intersect in exactly one point, and this point is at infinity if the lines are parallel." Such statements are suggested by the study of perspective, which may be considered as a central projection of the three dimensional space onto a plane (see Pinhole camera model). More precisely, the entrance pupil of a camera or of the eye of an observer is the center of projection, and the image is formed on the projection plane.

Mathematically, the center of projection is a point  of the space (the intersection of the axes in the figure); the projection plane (in blue on the figure) is a plane not passing through , which is often chosen to be the plane of equation , when Cartesian coordinates are considered. Then, the central projection maps a point  to the intersection of the line  with the projection plane.

This suggests to define the points (called here projective points for clarity) of the projective plane as the lines passing through . A projective line in this plane consists of all projective points (which are lines) contained in a plane passing through . As the intersection of two planes passing through  is a line passing through , the intersection of two distinct projective lines consists of a single projective point. The plane 

As an affine space with a distinguished point  may be identified with its associated vector space (see ), the preceding construction is generally done by starting from a vector space and is called projectivization. Also, the construction can be done by starting with a vector space of any positive dimension.

So, a projective space of dimension  can be defined as the set of vector lines (vector subspaces of dimension one) in a vector space of dimension . A projective space can also be defined as the elements of any set that is in natural correspondence with this set of vector lines.

This set can be the set of equivalence classes under the equivalence relation between vectors defined by "one vector is the product of the other by a nonzero scalar". In other words, this amounts to defining a projective space as the set of vector lines in which the zero vector has been removed.

A third equivalent definition is to define a projective space of dimension  as the set of pairs of antipodal points in a sphere of dimension  (in a space of dimension ).

Definition
Given a vector space  over a field , the projective space  is the set of equivalence classes of  under the equivalence relation  defined by  if there is a nonzero element  of  such that . This is the case when  is the field  of the real numbers or the field  of the complex numbers.

The elements of a projective space  are commonly called points. If a basis of  has been chosen, and, in particular if , the projective coordinates of a point P are the coordinates on the basis of any element of the corresponding equivalence class. These coordinates are commonly denoted , the colons and the brackets being used for distinguishing from usual coordinates, and emphasizing that this is an equivalence class, which is defined up to the multiplication by a non zero constant. Also, the above definition implies that  are projective coordinates of a point if and only if at least one of the coordinates is nonzero.

If  is the field of real or complex numbers, a projective space is called a real projective space or a complex projective space, respectively. If  is one or two, a projective space of dimension  is called a projective line or a projective plane, respectively. The complex projective line is also called the Riemann sphere.

All these definitions extend naturally to the case where  is a division ring; see, for example, Quaternionic projective space. If  is a finite field with  elements,  is often denoted  (see PG(3,2)).

Related concepts

Subspace
Let  be a projective space, where  is a vector space over a field , and 

be the canonical map that maps a nonzero vector to its equivalence class, which is the vector line containing  with the zero vector removed.

A projective subspace is thus a projective space that is obtained by restricting to a linear subspace the equivalence relation that defines .

It follows that:

In synthetic geometry, where projective lines are primitive objects, the first property is an axiom, and the second one is the definition of a projective subspace.

Span
Every intersection of projective subspaces is a projective subspace. It follows that for every subset  of a projective space, there is a smallest projective subspace containing , the intersection of all projective subspaces containing .

If  is a spanning set of a projective space , then there is a subset of  that spans  and is projectively independent (this results from the similar theorem for vector spaces).

Contrarily to the cases of vector spaces and affine spaces, an independent spanning set does not suffice for defining coordinates. One needs one more point, see next section.

Frame

A projective frame is an ordered set of points in a projective space that allows defining coordinates. More precisely, in a -dimensional projective space, a projective frame is a tuple of  points such that any  of them are independent—that is are not contained in a hyperplane.

By rescaling the first  vectors, any frame can be rewritten as  such that  this representation is unique up to the multiplication of all  with a common nonzero factor.

Projective geometry

Projective transformation

Topology

A projective space is a topological space, as endowed with the quotient topology of the topology of a finite dimensional real vector space.

Let  be the unit sphere in a normed vector space , and consider the function

This function is continuous and surjective. The inverse image of every point of  consist of two antipodal points. As spheres are compact spaces, it follows that: 

This shows that a projective space is a manifold. A simple atlas can be provided, as follows.

For , the set

since every point of  has at least one nonzero coordinate.

To each  is associated a chart, which is the homeomorphisms

such that 

where hats means that the corresponding term is missing.

These charts form an atlas, and, as the transition maps are analytic functions, it results that projective spaces are analytic manifolds.

In both lines, the intersection of the two charts is the set of nonzero real numbers, and the transition map is 

in both directions. The image represents the projective line as a circle where antipodal points are identified, and shows the two homeomorphisms of a real line to the projective line; as antipodal points are identified, the image of each line is represented as an open half circle, which can be identified with the projective line with a single point removed.

CW complex structure

Algebraic geometry

Originally, algebraic geometry was the study of common zeros of sets of multivariate polynomials. These common zeros, called algebraic varieties belong to an affine space. It appeared soon, that in the case of real coefficients, one must consider all the complex zeros for having accurate results. For example, the fundamental theorem of algebra asserts that a univariate square-free polynomial of degree  has exactly  complex roots. In the multivariate case, the consideration of complex zeros is also needed, but not sufficient: one must also consider zeros at infinity. For example, Bézout's theorem asserts that the intersection of two plane algebraic curves of respective degrees  and  consists of exactly  points if one consider complex points in the projective plane, and if one counts the points with their multiplicity. Another example is the genus–degree formula that allows computing the genus of a plane algebraic curve from its singularities in the complex projective plane.

So a projective variety is the set of points in a projective space, whose homogeneous coordinates are common zeros of a set of homogeneous polynomials.

Any affine variety can be completed, in a unique way, into a projective variety by adding its points at infinity, which consists of homogenizing the defining polynomials, and removing the components that are contained in the hyperplane at infinity, by saturating with respect to the homogenizing variable.

An important property of projective spaces and projective varieties is that the image of a projective variety under a morphism of algebraic varieties is closed for Zariski topology (that is, it is an algebraic set). This is a generalization to every ground field of the compactness of the real and complex projective space.

A projective space is itself a projective variety, being the set of zeros of the zero polynomial.

Scheme theory
Scheme theory, introduced by Alexander Grothendieck during the second half of 20th century, allows defining a generalization of algebraic varieties, called schemes, by gluing together smaller pieces called affine schemes, similarly as manifolds can be built by gluing together open sets of   The Proj construction is the construction of the scheme of a projective space, and, more generally of any projective variety, by gluing together affine schemes. In the case of projective spaces, one can take for these affine schemes the affine schemes associated to the charts (affine spaces) of the above description of a projective space as a manifold.

Synthetic geometry 
In synthetic geometry, a projective space S can be defined axiomatically as a set P (the set of points), together with a set L of subsets of P (the set of lines), satisfying these axioms:
 Each two distinct points p and q are in exactly one line.
 Veblen's axiom: If a, b, c, d are distinct points and the lines through ab and cd meet, then so do the lines through ac and bd.
 Any line has at least 3 points on it.

The last axiom eliminates reducible cases that can be written as a disjoint union of projective spaces together with 2-point lines joining any two points in distinct projective spaces. More abstractly, it can be defined as an incidence structure  consisting of a set P of points, a set L of lines, and an incidence relation I that states which points lie on which lines.

The structures defined by these axioms are more general than those obtained from the vector space construction given above. If the (projective) dimension is at least three then, by the Veblen–Young theorem, there is no difference. However, for dimension two, there are examples that satisfy these axioms that can not be constructed from vector spaces (or even modules over division rings). These examples do not satisfy the Theorem of Desargues and are known as Non-Desarguesian planes. In dimension one, any set with at least three elements satisfies the axioms, so it is usual to assume additional structure for projective lines defined axiomatically.

It is possible to avoid the troublesome cases in low dimensions by adding or modifying axioms that define a projective space.  gives such an extension due to Bachmann. To ensure that the dimension is at least two, replace the three point per line axiom above by;
 There exist four points, no three of which are collinear.
To avoid the non-Desarguesian planes, include Pappus's theorem as an axiom;
 If the six vertices of a hexagon lie alternately on two lines, the three points of intersection of pairs of opposite sides are collinear.
And, to ensure that the vector space is defined over a field that does not have even characteristic include Fano's axiom;
 The three diagonal points of a complete quadrangle are never collinear.

A subspace of the projective space is a subset X, such that any line containing two points of X is a subset of X (that is, completely contained in X).  The full space and the empty space are always subspaces.

The geometric dimension of the space is said to be n if that is the largest number for which there is a strictly ascending chain of subspaces of this form:

A subspace  in such a chain is said to have (geometric) dimension . Subspaces of dimension 0 are called points, those of dimension 1 are called lines and so on. If the full space has dimension  then any subspace of dimension  is called a hyperplane.

Projective spaces admit an equivalent formulation in terms of lattice theory. There is a bijective correspondence between projective spaces and geomodular lattices, namely, subdirectly irreducible, compactly generated, complemented, modular lattices.

Classification
Dimension 0 (no lines): The space is a single point.
Dimension 1 (exactly one line): All points lie on the unique line.
Dimension 2: There are at least 2 lines, and any two lines meet. The Desarguesian planes (those that are isomorphic with a  satisfy Desargues's theorem and are projective planes over division rings, but there are many non-Desarguesian planes.

Finite projective spaces and planes
 

A finite projective space is a projective space where P is a finite set of points. In any finite projective space, each line contains the same number of points and the order of the space is defined as one less than this common number. For finite projective spaces of dimension at least three, Wedderburn's theorem implies that the division ring over which the projective space is defined must be a finite field, GF(q), whose order (that is, number of elements) is q (a prime power). A finite projective space defined over such a finite field has  points on a line, so the two concepts of order coincide.

All finite fields of the same order are isomorphic, so, up to isomorphism, there is only one finite projective space for each dimension greater than or equal to three, over a given finite field. However, in dimension two there are non-Desarguesian planes. Up to isomorphism there are

finite projective planes of orders 2, 3, 4, ..., 10, respectively. The numbers beyond this are very difficult to calculate and are not determined except for some zero values due to the Bruck–Ryser theorem.

The smallest projective plane is the Fano plane,  with 7 points and 7 lines. The smallest 3-dimensional projective spaces is PG(3,2), with 15 points, 35 lines and 15 planes.

Morphisms 
Injective linear maps  between two vector spaces V and W over the same field k induce mappings of the corresponding projective spaces  via:

where v is a non-zero element of V and [...] denotes the equivalence classes of a vector under the defining identification of the respective projective spaces.  Since members of the equivalence class differ by a scalar factor, and linear maps preserve scalar factors, this induced map is well-defined. (If T is not injective, it has a null space larger than {0}; in this case the meaning of the class of T(v) is problematic if v is non-zero and in the null space. In this case one obtains a so-called rational map, see also birational geometry.)

Thus if one identifies the scalar multiples of the identity map with the underlying field K, the set of K-linear morphisms from P(V) to P(W) is simply .

The automorphisms  can be described more concretely. (We deal only with automorphisms preserving the base field K). Using the notion of sheaves generated by global sections, it can be shown that any algebraic (not necessarily linear) automorphism must be linear, i.e., coming from a (linear) automorphism of the vector space V. The latter form the group GL(V). By identifying maps that differ by a scalar, one concludes that

the quotient group of GL(V) modulo the matrices that are scalar multiples of the identity. (These matrices form the center of Aut(V).) The groups PGL are called projective linear groups. The automorphisms of the complex projective line P1(C) are called Möbius transformations.

Dual projective space
When the construction above is applied to the dual space V∗ rather than V, one obtains the dual projective space, which can be canonically identified with the space of hyperplanes through the origin of V.  That is, if V is n dimensional, then P(V∗) is the Grassmannian of  planes in V.

In algebraic geometry, this construction allows for greater flexibility in the construction of projective bundles.  One would like to be able to associate a projective space to every quasi-coherent sheaf E over a scheme Y, not just the locally free ones. See EGAII, Chap. II, par. 4 for more details.

Generalizations
dimension The projective space, being the "space" of all one-dimensional linear subspaces of a given vector space V is generalized to Grassmannian manifold, which is parametrizing higher-dimensional subspaces (of some fixed dimension) of V.
sequence of subspaces More generally flag manifold is the space of flags, i.e., chains of linear subspaces of V.
other subvarieties Even more generally, moduli spaces parametrize objects such as elliptic curves of a given kind.
other rings Generalizing to associative rings (rather than only fields) yields, for example, the projective line over a ring.
patching Patching projective spaces together yields projective space bundles.

Severi–Brauer varieties are algebraic varieties over a field k, which become isomorphic to projective spaces after an extension of the base field k.

Another generalization of projective spaces are weighted projective spaces; these are themselves special cases of toric varieties.

See also
 Geometric algebra

 Generalizations
Grassmannian manifold
Projective line over a ring
Space (mathematics)

Projective geometry
projective transformation
projective representation

Notes

Citations

References 

 
 
 
 
 
 Greenberg, M.J.; Euclidean and non-Euclidean geometries, 2nd ed. Freeman (1980).
 , esp. chapters I.2, I.7, II.5, and II.7
 Hilbert, D. and Cohn-Vossen, S.; Geometry and the imagination, 2nd ed. Chelsea (1999).

 (Reprint of 1910 edition)

External links
 
 
 Projective Planes of Small Order

Projective geometry
Space (mathematics)